Japan participated in the 2009 Asian Indoor Games in Hanoi, Vietnam on 30 October – 8 November 2009. The nation finished eleventh in the medal table after collected 5 gold, 9 silver, and 9 bronze medals.

Medal summary

Medal table

Medalists

References

Japan at the Asian Indoor Games
Nations at the 2009 Asian Indoor Games
2009 in Japanese sport